"Hell Yeah" is a song written by Jeffrey Steele and Craig Wiseman and recorded by American country music duo Montgomery Gentry.  It was released in July 2003 as the third and final single from the duo's album My Town. The song peaked at number 4 on the US Billboard Hot Country Singles & Tracks chart and reached number 45 on the Billboard Hot 100.

Content
The narrator recounts the lives of two people, a male of "the Haggard generation" and a female of "the Me Generation", who both like to party and want to go back to when "life was good and love was easy."

Music video
The music video was directed by Trey Fanjoy and premiered in late 2003.

Charts positions
"Hell Yeah" debuted at number 59 on the U.S. Billboard Hot Country Songs for the week of July 26, 2003. The song has sold 492,000 copies in the U.S. as of September 2017.

Year-end charts

Parodies
 American parody artist Cledus T. Judd released a parody of "Hell Yeah" titled "Hell No" on his 2004 album Bipolar and Proud.

References

2003 singles
Montgomery Gentry songs
Songs written by Jeffrey Steele
Songs written by Craig Wiseman
Music videos directed by Trey Fanjoy
Columbia Records singles
Song recordings produced by Blake Chancey
2002 songs